The 1941 All-Big Six Conference football team consists of American football players chosen by various organizations for All-Big Six Conference teams for the 1941 college football season.  The selectors for the 1941 season included the Associated Press (AP) and the United Press (UP).

The 1941 Missouri Tigers football team won the Big Six championship, was ranked No. 7 in the final AP Poll, and placed five players on the first team: quarterback Harry Ice (AP-1, UP-1); halfback Bob Steuber (AP-1, UP-1); tackle Norville Wallach (AP-1, UP-1); guard Robert Jeffries (AP-1, UP-1); and center Darold Jenkins (AP-1, UP-1).

The 1941 Nebraska Cornhuskers football team finished second in the conference and placed two players on the first team: halfback Dale Bradley (AP-1, UP-1) and guard George Abel (AP-1, UP-1).

All-Big Six selections

Backs
 Harry Ice, Missouri (AP-1, UP-1 [QB]) (College Football Hall of Fame)
 Bob Steuber, Missouri (AP-1, UP-1 [HB])
 Dale Bradley, Nebraska (AP-1, UP-1 [HB])
 Jack Jacobs, Oklahoma (AP-1, UP-1 [FB])
 Maurice "Red" Wade, Missouri (AP-2, UP-2 [QB])
 Ralph Miller, Kansas (AP-2, UP-2 [HB])
 Orville Mathews, Oklahoma (AP-2, UP-2 [HB])
 Lyle Wilkins, Kansas State (UP-2 [FB])
 Don "Bull" Reece, Missouri (AP-2)

Ends
 Hubert Ulrich, Kansas (AP-1, UP-1)
 Frank Barnhart, Kansas State (UP-1)
 Fred Preston, Kansas (AP-1, UP-2)
 Bert Ekern, Missouri (AP-2, UP-2)

Tackles
 Roger Eason, Oklahoma (AP-1, UP-1)
 Norville Wallach, Missouri (AP-1, UP-1)
 C. Herndon, Nebraska (UP-2)
 Robert Brenton, Missouri (AP-2, UP-2)

Guards
 George Abel, Nebraska (AP-1, UP-1)
 Robert Jeffries, Missouri (AP-1, UP-1)
 Ralph Harris, Oklahoma (UP-2)
 LaVerne Lewis, Iowa State (UP-2)
 Fred Meier, Nebraska (AP-2)

Centers
 Darold Jenkins, Missouri (AP-1, UP-1) (College Football Hall of Fame)
 John Hancock, Kansas State (AP-2, UP-2)

Key
AP = Associated Press
UP = United Press

See also
1941 College Football All-America Team

References

All-Big Six Conference football team
All-Big Eight Conference football teams